Casey Dellacqua was the defending champion, however she chose not to participate.

Eri Hozumi won the title, defeating Risa Ozaki in an all-Japanese final, 7–6(7–5), 5–7, 6–2.

Seeds

Main draw

Finals

Top half

Bottom half

References 

 Main draw

Bendigo Women's International (1) - Singles